Barangay BF Homes Caloocan or Barangay 169 is a barangay of Caloocan, Metro Manila, Philippines. The barangay is known for having jurisdiction of the larger portions of the Banco Filipino-developed real estate projects in Northern Manila, and is considered the most affluent barangay in Caloocan.

History
The original territory of Caloocan when it was founded in 1815 included present-day Marikina, Diliman and Tondo. When Novaliches was created a municipality in 1855, portions of Caloocan were ceded to Novaliches. In turn, Novaliches had an area of 200-300 square kilometers bounding with San Jose del Monte, Bulacan in the north, the Morong towns of Montalban and San Mateo in the east, Caloocan in the south; and Bulacan towns of Meycauayan and Polo in the west.

During the reduction of Novaliches into a barrio, it was ceded to Caloocan in 1903. Upon the creation of Quezon City in 1939, the Novaliches district was divided into two: a portion under the jurisdiction of Caloocan and Quezon City. In the Caloocan city charter of 1962, the geographical location of the current barangay which is part of Novaliches, is among portions ceded to Caloocan.

In 1964, Tomas Aguirre, whose family is of the Agencia de Empeños de Aguirre pawnshop fame, founded Banco Filipino with the aid of money from the family business. By around 1966, BF had become the premiere bank in the Philippines. Aguirre, figured that with such earnings, it was time to venture into the next phase and to consider land development. With that, he put up the BF Homes Incorporated (BFHI) arm to further realize his goal.

In the barangay regrouping, Barangay BF Homes Caloocan included other real estate developments: Estrella Homes and Santa Fe Homesite.

In recent history, BF Homes is where the 2007 oath-taking of Antonio Trillanes as a senator occurred, wherein, as resident, his oath was administered by the barangay chairperson. Also, the suspected Communist Leader, Andrea Rosal, was arrested together with several others in a house in this barangay.

Geography
The barangay is located in North Caloocan. The Meycauayan River estuaries flows along the western borders of the barangay, separating it from Barangay Llano. To its north lies Barangay Deparo, and its southern and eastern borders are shared with barangays of Novaliches, Quezon City.

Schools
The barangay has jurisdiction over a public daycare institution, and three private K12 schools.

Binhi Day Care Center
Holy Infant Montessori Center
TMW International Academy
Academy of Saint Andrew - Caloocan

Places of Worship
Christ the King Parish Church BF Homes
Life in the Word Christian Church

References

Caloocan
Barangays of Metro Manila